Clinton Eugene McDaniel (born February 26, 1972) is a retired American professional basketball player. McDaniel played professionally in the NBA for the Sacramento Kings. He played college basketball for the Arkansas Razorbacks.

College career
A 6'4" (1.93 m) guard from the University of Arkansas, McDaniel was a key member of the 1994 National Championship team that defeated Duke University, 76–72. Born and raised in Tulsa, Oklahoma, McDaniel was considered the best on ball defender in the country.

Professional career
McDaniel went on to play in the National Basketball Association (NBA), signing as a free agent Sacramento Kings during the 1995-96 NBA season signing  with the Washington Wizards in the 1996–97 season but was later released. He has also played professionally in Europe and in the Australian National Basketball League (NBL) with the Perth Wildcats and the South East Melbourne Magic. McDaniel has been selected as a recipient of the prestigious 2014 SEC Men's Basketball Legends Award. McDaniel is the first of only two players in SEC history to ever record 100 steals in a single season(102). McDaniel was named to the AP 3rd Team All-Conference 1995, and named to the 1995 Final Four All-Tournament Team.

References

1972 births
Living people
African-American basketball players
American expatriate basketball people in Australia
American men's basketball players
Arkansas Razorbacks men's basketball players
Basketball players from Oklahoma
Perth Wildcats players
Sacramento Kings players
Shooting guards
South East Melbourne Magic players
Sportspeople from Tulsa, Oklahoma
Undrafted National Basketball Association players
21st-century African-American sportspeople
20th-century African-American sportspeople